Property Management Systems (PMS)  or Hotel Operating System (HOS), under business, terms may be used in real estate, manufacturing, logistics, intellectual property, government, or hospitality accommodation management.  They are computerized systems that facilitate the management of properties, personal property, equipment, including maintenance, legalities and personnel all through a single piece of software.  They replaced old-fashioned, paper-based methods that tended to be both cumbersome and inefficient. They are often deployed as client/server configurations. Today, most next-generation property management systems favor a software as a service (SaaS) model sustained by web and cloud technologies.

Hospitality industry

The first property management systems in the hospitality industry appeared on the market in the 1980s. Today, they are considered the most important piece of hotel technology. 

In hotels, a property management system, also known as a PMS, is a comprehensive software application used to cover objectives like coordinating the operational functions of the front office, sales and planning, reporting etc. The system automates hotel operations like guest bookings, guest details, online reservations, posting of charges, point of sale, telephone, accounts receivable, sales and marketing, events, food and beverage costing, materials management, HR and payroll, maintenance management, quality management and other amenities. Hotel property management systems may have integrated or interface with third-party solutions like central reservation systems and revenue or yield management systems, online booking engine, back office, point of sale, door-locking, housekeeping optimization, pay-TV, energy management, payment card authorization and channel management systems.

With the advancement of cloud computing property management systems for hotels expand their functionality towards new service areas like guest-facing features. These include online check-in, room service, in-room controls, guest-staff communication, virtual concierge and more. These new functionalities are mainly used by guests on their own mobile devices or such provided by the hotel in lobbies and/or rooms.

A good PMS should give accurate and timely information on the basic key performance indicators of a hotel business such as average daily rate, RevPAR or occupancy rate and help the food and beverage management control the stocks in the store room and help deciding what to buy, how much and how often.

Local government

Property management systems are used in local government authorities, since these authorities hold and manage large property estates ranging from schools, leisure centres, social housing and parks not to mention investment properties such as shops and industrial estates - even pubs. All of these are necessary income earners for a local authority, so the efficiency gained through an automated, computerized system is essential.

Manufacturing and logistics industries
Property management systems are used to manage, control and account for personal property.
Property is defined as the equipment, tooling and physical capital assets that are acquired and used to build, repair and maintain end item deliverables. Property Management involves the processes, systems and manpower required to manage the life cycle of all acquired property as defined above including Acquisition, Control, Accountability, Maintenance, Utilization, and disposition.

Commercial properties
Property Management systems allow local property managers and maintenance personnel to manage the day-to-day operations of their properties. Property maintenance for commercial properties includes major focus areas such as risk management, maintenance, communication, and tenant satisfaction. Usually a certain agreed percentage of the rent payment will be deducted on each rent payment collected by the property management as their service fee. There are also other ways of charging the property owners using the service but percentage collection is the common one.

See also
Hotel Technology Next Generation
Hotel reservation system
Computer reservation system
Computer-aided facility management
Property management software

References

Travel technology
Property management